This is a list of 137 species in the genus Tingis.

Tingis species

References

Articles created by Qbugbot